The United Irishman was an Irish nationalist newspaper founded in 1899 by Arthur Griffith and William Rooney.

United Irishman may also refer to: 
United Irishman (1848 newspaper), founded by John Mitchel
United Irishman (1948 newspaper), the official monthly organ of Sinn Féin, and later of Official Sinn Féin
United Irishman (2000 newspaper), produced by those involved in the Official Republican Movement

See also
 Society of United Irishmen, organised the Irish Rebellion of 1798